Victor is a French short film released in 1993, written by Nicolas Mercier and François Ozon, directed by Ozon, and starring François Genty.

Plot
Victor is a young man of good breeding, who keeps his dead parents in the bedroom of their sumptuous family cottage. The new status quo opens the door for new discoveries.

Cast

 François Genty
 Isabelle Journeau
 Jean-Jacques Forbin
 Laurent Labasse
 Martine Erhel
 Daniel Martinez

References
 KINO Video A Curtain Raiser and Other Shorts
 Article at Cinécritiques (in French)

External links
 
 Victor at François Ozon's website (in French) 

1993 films
Films directed by François Ozon
1990s French-language films
French short films
1993 short films
1990s French films